Bruno Leone Camacho da Silva (born 28 October 1985) is a Brazilian football player who last played for Miami United FC in the National Premier Soccer League.

Honours
Shanghai East Asia
 China League One: 2012

References

External links
 
 Bruno Camacho at ZeroZero

1985 births
Living people
Brazilian footballers
Lierse S.K. players
Shanghai Port F.C. players
Clube Atlético Juventus players
Clube Náutico Capibaribe players
Belgian Pro League players
China League One players
Brazilian expatriate footballers
Expatriate footballers in Belgium
Brazilian expatriate sportspeople in Belgium
Expatriate footballers in China
Brazilian expatriate sportspeople in China
Expatriate soccer players in the United States
Association football defenders
Brazilian expatriate sportspeople in the United States
National Premier Soccer League players
Brazilian expatriate sportspeople in Kuwait
Expatriate footballers in Kuwait
Kazma SC players
Kuwait Premier League players